Tin Shui Wai New Force is a localist political group in Hong Kong established in late 2014 by a group of young people who had participated in the Umbrella Revolution. It claims to cater to the livelihood issues in Tin Shui Wai district.

In the 2015 District Council elections, Wong Pak-yu, representing the group, ran in Tin Heng constituency against Beijing-loyalist Hong Kong Federation of Trade Unions (FTU) incumbent Luk Chung-hung but was defeated. In 2016, the group joined hands with other post-Umbrella organisations to run in the Legislative Council election.

Performance in elections

Legislative Council elections

District Council elections

See also
 Youngspiration
 Kowloon East Community
 Localism in Hong Kong
 Sha Tin Community Network

References

2014 establishments in Hong Kong
Localist parties in Hong Kong
Political organisations based in Hong Kong
Tin Shui Wai